The Fourth Govind Ballabh Pant ministry is the Council of Ministers in 1st Uttar Pradesh Legislative Assembly headed by Chief Minister Govind Ballabh Pant from 1952 to 1954.

Chief Minister & Cabinet Ministers 
 Govind Ballabh Pant - Chief Minister, General Administration, Planning, Cooperatives
 Hafiz Mohd Ibrahim - Finance, Power
 Sampurnanand - Home, Labour
 Hukum Singh - Industry and relief, Rehabilitation
 Girdhari Lal - Public Works
 Chandra Bhanu Gupta - Civil Supplies, Health
 Charan Singh - Revenue, Agriculture
 Syed Ali Zahir - Law, Excise
 Hargovind Singh - Education, Harijan and Social Welfare
 Mohanlal Gautam - Self-governance
 Kamalapati Tripathi - Information, Irrigation

Deputy Ministers 
 Mangla Prasad - Parliamentary Affairs, Cooperatives
 Jagmohan Singh Negi - Forest
 Jagan Prasad Rawat - Agriculture
 Muzaffar Hasan - Prison
 Chaturbhuj Sharma - Public Works
 Ram Murti - Irrigation
 Phool Singh - Planning

Parliamentary Secretaries 
 Kripa Shankar - Attached with Chief Minister
 Banarsi Das - Attached With Civil Supplies and Health Minister
 Baldev Singh Arya - Attached With Civil Supplies and Health Minister
 Sita Ram -  Attached With Education Minister
 Dwarika Prasad Maurya - Attached With Agriculture and Revenue Minister
 Mohd Rauf Jafri - Attached With Industry and relief, Rehabilitation Minister

See also
 First Sampurnanand ministry

References

Pant
Indian National Congress state ministries
1954 establishments in Uttar Pradesh
Cabinets established in 1954